The Gau Westphalia-North (German: Gau Westfalen-Nord) was an administrative division of Nazi Germany encompassing the Free State of Lippe, the Free State of Schaumburg-Lippe and the northern half of the Prussian province of Westphalia between 1933 and 1945. From 1931 to 1933, it was the regional subdivision of the Nazi Party for these areas.

History
The Nazi Gau (plural Gaue) system was originally established in a party conference on 22 May 1926, in order to improve administration of the party structure. From 1933 onward, after the Nazi seizure of power, the Gaue increasingly replaced the German states as administrative subdivisions in Germany.

At the head of each Gau stood a Gauleiter, a position which became increasingly more powerful, especially after the outbreak of the Second World War, with little interference from above. Local Gauleiters often held government positions as well as party ones and were in charge of, among other things, propaganda and surveillance and, from September 1944 onward, the Volkssturm and the defense of the Gau.

The position of Gauleiter in Westphalia-North was held by Alfred Meyer from its formation until his suicide on 11 April 1945.

References

External links
 Illustrated list of Gauleiter

Westphalia North
1933 establishments in Germany
1945 disestablishments in Germany
Westphalia